Agios Ilias (Greek: Άγιος Ηλίας meaning Saint Elias) is a village located in the municipal unit of Amaliada, northern Elis, Peloponnese, Greece. It is situated near the western shore of the Pineios reservoir, 2 km southeast of Kentro, 3 km north of Keramidia and 13 km northeast of Amaliada.

Historical population

See also
List of settlements in Elis

References

Populated places in Elis